Kragero may refer to:
 Kragero, Minnesota, United States
 Kragerø, Telemark, Norway